Tim Omotoso (born Timothy Oluseun Omotoso, 14 July 1958) is the senior pastor of a Jesus Dominion International, based in Durban, South Africa. He is currently in jail and on trial at the Port Elizabeth high court for rape and human trafficking. He is alleged to have groomed his victims and began molesting them from the age of 14. He was arrested by the South African priority crimes unit, Hawks, on Thursday, 20 April 2017 at the Port Elizabeth International Airport.

Career
The global outreach arm of his ministry functions under Tim Omotoso Global Outreach (T.O.G.O),it is an Apostolic and Prophetic ministry designed under Trinitarian auspices to propagate the gospel of Jesus Christ to this generation with signs following.  The Church arm is Jesus Dominion International with branches across South Africa, France and the UK; it holds crusades all over the world. His mandate is to turn the hearts of men back to God.  This vision is carried out through the Church arm- Jesus Dominion International, Help the Helpless project which reaches out to the less privileged and needy in society, and a youth empowerment Project (YEP) which is set to empower youth and mentor them.

Omotoso has initiated a youth project in South Africa called “Youth Empowerment Project” (YEP), under which he has mentored a number of music groups including Grace Galaxy and Simply Chrysolite who have composed their own songs and produced albums under his guidance.

In one of the awards they were in the same category with Kelly Rowlands for best international act BEFFTA awards and they won the award. This vision is carried out through the Church arm- Jesus Dominion International, Help the Helpless project which reaches out to the less privileged and needy in society, and a youth empowerment Project (YEP) which is set to empower youth and mentor them.

Television
Omotoso is the founder of a 24-hour satellite TV station, Ancient of Days Broadcasting Network (ADBN), which airs across the Caribbean, Africa, Mexico, Middle East, Europe and United States. His weekly TV broadcast, 'Just As I Am', features music, sermons and miracle sessions and airs across various networks .

Publications
He has written a book titled How to Enjoy Health, Wealth and Longevity and also a prayer book - Prayer Bonanza. His ministry also publishes an annual daily devotional. His messages are also available on DVD.

Personal life
He has said he was taught by the Lord to play the piano, the guitar, drums and other musical instruments before the age of 10. In the 1980s, he served as a music director for Ebenezer Obey's Decross Band & Inter Reformers' Band in the 80s.

Allegations

Omotoso is alleged to have groomed people and abused them from the age of 14. He was arrested by the South African priority crimes unit, Hawks, on Thursday, 20 April 2017 at the Port Elizabeth International Airport.

References

External links
Tim Omotoso Ministries

1958 births
Living people
People from Oyo State
Nigerian evangelicals
Nigerian television evangelists
Nigerian Pentecostal pastors
Yoruba Christian clergy
People charged with rape
People charged with racketeering